Salaam or Od Yavo Shalom Aleinu is a peace song by Mosh Ben-Ari composed while he was in the band Sheva (seven). It is sung in Hebrew and Arabic, and has gained popularity in Israeli folk music. "Od Yavo Shalom Aleinu" means "Peace will come upon us, yet." It is an upbeat song that became an anthem associated with attempts to create a peaceful end to the Arab–Israeli conflict.

The song typically begins slowly and somewhat plaintively, and, as it repeats, gradually increases in tempo and excitement.

Lyrics 
Lyrics of Salaam, from the bridge:

References

External links
 Mosh Ben-Ari - Salaam on YouTube
 Translation of song lyrics 

Arabic-language songs
Macaronic songs
Mass media about the Arab–Israeli conflict
Israeli songs
Israeli–Palestinian conflict in popular culture
Hebrew-language songs
Judaism and peace
Peace songs
1997 songs